Bingzhou or Bing Prefecture was a zhou (prefecture) in imperial China, centering on modern Taiyuan, Shanxi, China. It existed (intermittently) from the Tang dynasty until 723 and from 979 until 1059, when the Song dynasty renamed it Taiyuan Prefecture.

History

Tang dynasty
During the Tang dynasty (618–907), Bing Prefecture covered only areas in present-day Shanxi, which included south of present-day Yangqu County, north of Wenshui County and east of midstream of the Fen River. In 723 Bing Prefecture was renamed to Taiyuan Prefecture.

Song dynasty
In 979 during the Song dynasty (960–1127), Bing Prefecture was restored and its capital set up in Yuci County (榆次縣; present-day Yuci District, Jinzhong, Shanxi). Three years later the capital was moved to Yangqu County (陽曲縣; present-day Yangqu County, Shanxi). In 1059 it was integrated into Taiyuan Prefecture.

See also
Taiyuan Prefecture

References
 

Prefectures of the Tang dynasty
Prefectures of the Song dynasty
Former prefectures in Shanxi